Tejgaon Mohila College is a degree college for women situated in Farmgate, Dhaka, Bangladesh. It was established in 1972 by Bangabondhu Sheikh Mujibur Rahman. It is also a tutorial centre for Bangladesh Open University. Mohammad Nazrul Islam is the principal of the college and Mrs. Nasreen Akhter is the vice principal of the college.

References

Universities and colleges in Dhaka
Educational institutions established in 1972